The Fonz is a nickname of the fictional character Arthur Fonzarelli in the television sitcom Happy Days.

Fonz may also refer to:

 Fonz (video game), a 1976 arcade racing video game based on the television series
 Fonz, Huesca, Spain, a municipality
 Carmen Guadalupe Fonz (born 1954), Mexican politician

See also
 Lucky Fonz III, Dutch singer-songwriter Otto Wichers (born 1981)